Schaller is a German surname. Notable people with the surname include:

Albert Schaller (1857–1934), American jurist and politician
Anton Schaller (born 1944), Swiss journalist and politician
Anton Ferdinand Schaller (1773–1844), Austrian painter
Barry R. Schaller (1938–2017), American lawyer, judge, academic, and bioethicist
Biff Schaller (1889–1939), American baseball player
Chris Schaller (1935–1984), American journalist and editor
Christian Schaller, German theologian
François Schaller (1928–2006), Swiss economist
Gábor Schaller (born 1966), Hungarian equestrian
George Schaller (born 1933), American biologist
Gerd Schaller (born 1965), German conductor
Gilbert Schaller (born 1969), Austrian tennis player
Hans Schaller, German luger
Hans-Peter Schaller (born 1963), Austrian football manager
Johann Gottlieb Schaller (1734–1814), German zoologist and entomologist
Johann Nepomuk Schaller (1777–1842), Viennese professor and sculptor
Johanna Schaller-Klier (born 1952), German Olympic hurdler
John Schaller (1912–1978), American politician
József Schaller (1894–1927), Hungarian footballer
Julius Schaller (1810–1868), German philosopher
Käte Schaller-Härlin (1877–1973), German painter
Laso Schaller (born 1988), Brazilian-Swiss athlete
Lyle E. Schaller (1923–2015), Church consultant and author
Mark Schaller, American psychologist
Michel Schaller (born 1969), French table tennis player
Nicole Schaller (born 1993), Swiss badminton player
Oliver Schaller (born 1994), Swiss badminton player
Petra Schmidt-Schaller (born 1980), German actress
Rainer Schaller (born 1969), German entrepreneur
René Schaller (1915–?), Swiss footballer
Simone Schaller (1912–2016), American hurdler
Sophia Schaller (born 2000), Austrian figure skater
Thomas Schaller (born 1967), American political scientist
Tim Schaller (born 1990), American ice hockey player
Tony Schaller, Belgian writer
Willy Schaller (1933–2015), American soccer player

German-language surnames